The Blue Mountains Dams are a series of six dams in the Blue Mountains which supply water to the Blue Mountains and Sydney, Australia. The Dams are managed by the WaterNSW. Water in this scheme may be supplemented from the Fish River Scheme.

Cascade Dams
There are three dams built on the Cascade Creek, near Katoomba, known as Cascade numbers 1, 2 and 3. The Middle Dam was  first, completed in 1908. The Lower Cascade Dam is an earthfill embankment dam with a central concrete core which was completed in 1926. The Upper Cascade Dam is another earthfill embankment dam, built in 1938.

Middle Cascade Dam is a "Darley-Wade" dam named after the series of dams designed by L.A.B Wade, a prominent dam engineer of the era and CW Darley who designed the first constant radius thin-arch dam in Australia (Lithgow 1). It was originally constructed in 1908 as a buttress section before being raised to a constant radius arch dam to satisfy the increasing water demand of the area. Stage 1, known originally as "Katoomba Dam" was a curved buttress dam built to a height of 7.6m. The dam was built with every intent for future raising. The dam was raised by filling in the spaces of the buttresses with concrete. The right abutment consists of a gravity section to increase the effectiveness of the arch action and due to unsuitable foundations for an arch abutment.

Lake Medlow and Greaves Creek Dams

The heritage-listed Lake Medlow and Greaves Creek Dams were built on the Adams and Greaves Creeks respectively. Lake Medlow Dam was the first concrete thin arch, high stress dam built in New South Wales, and is one of the thinnest dams in the world. Greaves Creek Dam is also a concrete arch dam, it was completed in 1942. Sydney Water decommissioned the Greaves Creek Treatment Plant.

Woodford Creek Dam
Woodford Creek Dam is a concrete arch dam which was built on the junction of Woodford Creek and Bulls Creek and completed in 1928. It was subsequently raised several times. Water is no longer drawn from Woodford Dam. In late 2009 Woodford Dam surrounds were opened up to walkers and mountain bikers. Access to the dam wall and lake is still prohibited.

Originally envisaged to supply steam trains, Woodford Dam is one of six dams constructed to supply water to the Blue Mountains area. Two raisings have occurred with the latest in 1947. Due to the closure of the Linden Water filtration Plant in circa 2000, the storage is no longer used for water supply and the outlet raw water pipework has been disconnected and capped.

The first stage was constructed by NSW Railways between 1928 and 1929. Stage two raised the storage by 2.44m in 1935. The final third stage increased the storage by an additional 3.05m in 1947.

Although rare, the storage has been used for rural firefighting by helicopters.

The dam wall is an arch/gravity structure with keyed vertical contraction joints and copper waterstops. The foundations are excavated into the sandstone in a series of steps

References

Coordinates 

  - Lake Medlow Dam
  - Greaves Creek Dam
  - Upper Cascade Dam
  - Middle Cascade Dam
  - Lower Cascade Dam
  - Woodford Dam

External links
 Blue Mountains Dams at WaterNSW.

Geography of Sydney
Blue Mountains (New South Wales)
Arch dams
Dams in New South Wales
Embankment dams
Earth-filled dams